Born to Beat (BTOB) is an EP by South Korean boy group BtoB under United Cube Entertainment.

Background and release
In March 2012, BtoB held their Premium Launching Show with two title tracks, "Imagine" (a ballad track) and "Insane" (a dance track). BtoB's debut songs as rookies are exceptional double title compositions that are represented as connected stories of different genres that showcases each of their own charms which shows BtoB's strategy in presenting their various musical capabilities fully.

The first title track, "Insane", has been produced by Seo Jae Woo, who has composed songs for other Cube artists such as 4minute and Beast.

"Imagine," the second track, is a ballad.

On March 20, 2012, a teaser for title track "Insane" was released on YouTube. On the same day, the group also released "Imagine", the second title track after "Insane", and on March 22, 2012, the group made their live performance debut on M! Countdown.

On May 23, 2012, a special edition of the album title Born To Beat (Asia Special Edition) was released, with an addition of two tracks which includes a new single titled "Irresistible Lips" and another track from their previous single titled "Father" and on the same day the music video for the track "Irresistible Lips" was also released.

Promotion
The group began their promotions for the album on 22 March 2012, on Mnet's M!Countdown followed by other various music programs like Music Bank, Inkigayo and Music Core respectively.

Track listing

Charts

Albums chart

Sales and certifications

References

Cube Entertainment EPs
Dance-pop EPs
2012 debut EPs
BtoB (band) EPs
Korean-language EPs